= Market research and opinion polling in China =

Market research and opinion polling in China has been conducted by several Chinese and Joint-Venture companies since the reform and opening up and market opening of the 1980s.

== Market research ==
Prior to the 1980s, the China Academy of Social Sciences used some research techniques, but there were no market research companies. Following inward investment and economic opening, by 1998 there were 850 registered companies, both Chinese and Joint-Ventures, conducting market research in China. Initially the main customers for market research in the 1990s were MNEs. The scope of research remains restricted and regulated.

The Chinese Private Enterprise Survey has surveyed thousands of entrepreneurs from every province since 1993.

== Opinion polling ==
Most market research is purely commercial, however one notable example of a commercial survey firm which also conducts general public opinion polls is Horizon Research (also known by its Chinese name Lingdian). Horizon's survey results are often reported in the Chinese media, and referenced in some discussions of public policy.
